Vermivora is a genus of New World warblers.

Species
Three species are accepted in the genus, one of them probably extinct:

Several additional species were formerly included in Vermivora, but have now been transferred to the genus Leiothlypis:
 Tennessee warbler Leiothlypis peregrina
 Orange-crowned warbler Leiothlypis celata
 Nashville warbler Leiothlypis ruficapilla
 Virginia's warbler Leiothlypis virginiae
 Colima warbler Leiothlypis crissalis
 Lucy's warbler Leiothlypis luciae

References

 
Bird genera
Parulidae